Abram Yakovlevich Belenky (1882 or 1883 – 16 October 1941) was a Russian revolutionary, Bolshevik and a major functionary of the Soviet secret police (Cheka / OGPU / NKVD), born in Swierżań, Russian Empire. In 1919-24, he was a head of V.I. Lenin security. He was later promoted to major of NKVD.

On 9 May 1938, Belenky was arrested and accused of having taken part in a counter-revolutionary plot organized by former NKVD officers, including Genrikh Yagoda. He was sentenced by the Special Council of the NKVD (OSO) to five years of Gulag imprisonment. In 1940, his sentence was cancelled and his case was re-opened, with the eventual outcome that he was executed by firing-squad on 16 October 1941.

References

1880s births
1941 deaths
People from Rahachow District
People from Rogachyovsky Uyezd
NKVD officers
Cheka
State Political Directorate officers
Belarusian Jews
Soviet Jews
Jews executed by the Soviet Union
Great Purge victims from Belarus
Majors of State Security
Russian revolutionaries